Virginia's 21st Senate district is one of 40 districts in the Senate of Virginia. It has been represented by Democrat John S. Edwards since 1996. Although it voted for Joe Biden, it is currently the most Republican-leaning district to be represented by a Democrat.

Geography
District 21 comprises the most Democratic-leaning parts of Southwest Virginia, including all of the City of Roanoke and Giles County, as well as part of Montgomery County (where Blacksburg is located) and a small sliver of Roanoke County.

The district overlaps with Virginia's 6th and 9th congressional districts, and with the 7th, 8th, 11th, 12th, and 17th districts of the Virginia House of Delegates. It borders the state of West Virginia.

Recent election results

2019

2015

2011

Federal and statewide results in District 21

Historical results
All election results below took place prior to 2011 redistricting, and thus were under different district lines.

2007

2003

1999

1995

References

Virginia Senate districts
Roanoke, Virginia
Blacksburg, Virginia